Sigurður Jónsson (20 December 1922 – 21 April 2019) was an Icelandic swimmer. He competed in the men's 200 metre breaststroke at the 1948 Summer Olympics.

References

External links
 

1922 births
2019 deaths
Sigurdur T. Jonsson
Sigurdur T. Jonsson
Swimmers at the 1948 Summer Olympics
Place of birth missing